Den Eimai Iroas (English: I'm Not a Hero) is the fourth studio album by Greek singer Giorgos Sabanis, released on 1 November 2012 by Cobalt Music in Greece and Cyprus, written entirely by Giorgos Sabanis and Eleana Vrahali.

Track listing

Singles
"Mono An Thes Emena"
"Mono An Thes Emena"  was the first single from the album. A music video for the song was released on 5 July 2012.
"Ora Miden"
"Ora Miden"  was the second single from the album, released on 10 October 2012 with video clip. Sabanis won award for "Best Video Clip Pop/Rock" with the song at the MAD Video Music Awards 2013.
"O,ti Kai Na Eimai"
The third single was "O,ti Kai Na Eimai". The video vlip of the song was released on 18 February 2013.
"Den Eimai Iroas"
"Den Eimai Iroas" was  released  to Greek radios on 20 May 2013.
"Mi Milas"
The last single from the album was released with video clip on 7 October 2013.

Release history

Charts
"Den Eimai Iroas" is the first certified album of Giorgos Sabanis. 
The album was announced Gold in Greece and Cyprus.

Personnel

Soumka – executive producer, mixing
Vaggelis Kiris – photography
Konstantinos Georgantas – artwork
Paul Stefanidis –  mastering engineer
Hristos Avdelas –  guitar, bass, drums
Dimitris Tsakoumis – creative director
Stelios Stylianou –  styling
Alex Panagi –  background vocals
Krida –  background vocals
Dimos Beke –  background vocals

References

Greek-language albums
2012 albums